

Ceolberht (or Coelbeorht; died between 845 and 869) was a medieval Bishop of London.

Ceolberht was consecrated between 816 and 824. He died between 845 and 869.

Citations

References

External links
 

Bishops of London
9th-century deaths
Year of birth unknown
9th-century English bishops